Trichapion rostrum, the baptisia seed pod weevil or wild indigo weevil, is a species of weevil in the family Brentidae.

Description
Adult is entirely black. Its namesake elongated snout is called a rostrum, and has antennae attached near its base.

Ecology
Adult females deposit eggs in seedpods of wild indigo (genus Baptisia) plants; the larvae feed on seeds in the pods.

Seed predation by weevils can adversely affect reproduction of the Baptisia host.

References

External links

Brentidae